Simon Westraadt (born 31 March 1986) is a South African rugby union player for the  in the Currie Cup. His regular playing position is hooker.  He previously played for Western Province,  and Enisei-STM.

He was a member of the Pumas side that won the Vodacom Cup for the first time in 2015, beating  24–7 in the final. Westraadt made seven appearances during the season 2021 in Currie Cup and won Russian Cup.

References

External links

itsrugby.co.uk profile

Living people
1986 births
South African rugby union players
Rugby union hookers
Rugby union players from Port Elizabeth
Western Province (rugby union) players
Griquas (rugby union) players
Pumas (Currie Cup) players
SWD Eagles players
Yenisey-STM Krasnoyarsk players